Bhujpur Union is a union of Fatikchhari Upazila, Chittagong District, Bangladesh.

History
There was a King Bhoj in the area in ancient time according to puthi (poem) written by Abdul Majid Pundit. Bhujpur is named after that King Bhoj. But there is no concrete evidence about this story.

Geography
It borders Narayanhat Union to the north, Manikchhari Upazila and Paindanga Union to the east, Harualchari Union to the south, and the Sitakunda Mountain Range to the west.

Demographics
As of 1991 Bangladesh census, Bhujpur union has a population of 27,932. Males constitute 14,387 of the population, and females 13,545.

Economy
Kazir Hat Heyako and Fakir Hat is main marketplaces in the union.

Administration
Bhujpur Union is divided into 12 mauzas: Amtali, Azimpur, Harina, Jungle Kaiyapukhia, Kotbaria, Paglichhari, Paschim Bhujpur, Paschim Kaiyapukhia, Purba Bhujpur, Purba Kaiuapukhia, Ramgarh Sitakunda R.F., and Singharia.

Education
Bhujpur Union has 3 high schools, 8 primary schools, and 6 madrassahs.

Bhujpur National School & College
Bhujpur Model High School
Mirzar Hat High School
East Bhujpur Primary School
Gasbaria Primary School
Shariatul Uloom Primary School
West Bhujpur A. Gani Primary School
Amtali Primary school
Kazir Hat Emdadul Islam Madrassa
Shariatul Uloom Madrassa

References

Unions of Bhujpur Thana